Politec is an IT outsourcing service provider, based in Brasília, Brazil. It employs over 6,000 people. In 2011, it was acquired by the Spanish company Indra Sistemas.

Awards
BusinessWeek Magazine (2006), ranked #2 in Gartner’s “Top 15 Emerging Outsourcing Players” 
Global Services GS100 List (2007), included in “World’s Top 10 Best Performing IT Services Providers”

References 

Technology companies of Brazil
Companies based in Brasília